Yolandita En Vivo is the second (2nd) live album by Puerto Rican singer Yolandita Monge. It was recorded live at Centro de Bellas Artes, Puerto Rico on September 17–19, 1999, but released in 2000.  This partial concert album contains several medleys of her early hits, a cover of Glenn Monroig's gay anthem "Me Dijeron"' and a duet with her daughter Paola González on the song "Sobreviviré".

This release was her last album of her recording contract under BMG U.S. Latin. The album earned Gold status and is available as a digital download at iTunes and Amazon retitled Trayectoria (En Vivo) with new cover picture and artwork.

Track listing

Credits and personnel

Vocals: Yolandita Monge
General Production: Carlos 'Topy' Mamery & Tony Mojena
Executive Producer: Roberto Nogueras
Production Manager: Bobby Martineau
Set Decoration & Design: Rafi Claudio
Sound: Wichie Sound, Berty Sound
Mixing Engineer: Chris P. De Villiers
Lighting Engineer: Fernando Aguilú
Production Assistants: Marcos Rivera, Iván Rodríguez, Julio Ortiz
Public Relations: Héctor Torres, Gretchen González, Zulma Santiago
Dancers: Karen Camacho, Glinka Avilés, Moraima Serra, Mariela Bisbal, Carlos David Pérez, Carlos Hernández, Danny Lugo, Marcos Santana, Emmanuel De Jesús.
Musical director: Miguel Rodríguez
Guitars: Ito Serrano
Bass: Junior Irizarry
Drums: Pepe Jiménez
Keyboards: Ramón Sánchez
Percussion: Eduardo Rosado
Piano: Alfonso Fuentes

Chorus: Yanira Torres, Iris Martínez, Paola González, Papo Sánchez, David Pérez
Special Appearance: Paola González ('Sobreviviré')
Wardrobe: Roy Longsworth
Wardrobe Assistants: Diana Vidal, Baby Rodríguez
Hair & Make-Up: Fernando Báez
Special Thanks: Dr. Juan Salgado, Dr. Miguel Garratón, Dr. Fernando Zalduondo
Photography: Rafi Claudio
Graphic Design: Juan Carlos Medina, Aparte Design

Notes

Track listing and credits from album booklet.
Released in Cassette Format on 2000 (74321-74989-4).
Re-released digitally by ARDC Music Division in April 2018.
Re-released digitally by YM Music on August 10, 2018 as "Trayectoria (En Vivo)"

Charts

Singles Charts

References

2000 live albums
Yolandita Monge live albums